Radical 30 or radical mouth meaning "mouth" is one of 31 of the 214  Kangxi radicals that are composed of 3 strokes.
 
In the Kangxi Dictionary, there are 1,146 characters (out of 40 000) to be found under this radical.

 is also the 37th indexing component in the Table of Indexing Chinese Character Components predominantly adopted by Simplified Chinese dictionaries published in mainland China.

Evolution

Derived characters

Literature 

Leyi Li: "Tracing the Roots of Chinese Characters: 500 Cases". Beijing 1993,

External links

Unihan data for U+53E3

030
037